The enzyme 2-oxoglutarate decarboxylase catalyzes the chemical reaction: 2-oxoglutarate  succinate semialdehyde + CO2

This enzyme belongs to the family of lyases, specifically the carboxy-lyases, which cleave carbon-carbon bonds.  The systematic name of this enzyme class is 2-oxoglutarate carboxy-lyase (succinate-semialdehyde-forming). Other names in common use include oxoglutarate decarboxylase, alpha-ketoglutarate decarboxylase, alpha-ketoglutaric decarboxylase, oxoglutarate decarboxylase, pre-2-oxoglutarate decarboxylase, and 2-oxoglutarate carboxy-lyase.  It employs one cofactor, thiamin diphosphate.

References

 

EC 4.1.1
Thiamine enzymes
Enzymes of unknown structure